Arthur Ssegwanyi (born March 12, 1988) is a Ugandan chess player. He was awarded the title of International Master (IM) by FIDE in 2015 as a result of winning the Zone 4.2 Individual Championship in the same year. This victory also qualified him to play in the FIDE World Cup 2015. In this event, he was paired against the fourth seed, Anish Giri. Ssegwanyi drew the first game in 158 moves, then lost the second game and consequently he was eliminated from the tournament. In 2016, he won the Tanzania Open Chess Championship in Dar es Salaam. Ssegwanyi has played for the Ugandan team in the Chess Olympiad since 2012.

References

11. IM Arthur Ssegwanyi wins  2016 Tanzania Open. https://kenyachessmasala.com/2016/11/im-arthur-ssegwanyi-2016-tanzania-open-winner.html
12. IM Arthur Ssegwanyi wins 2019 Rwabushenyi Open.  https://kenyachessmasala.com/2019/12/im-arthur-ssegwanyi-2019-rwabushenyi.html

External links 
 
 
 
 

1988 births
Living people
Chess International Masters
Chess Olympiad competitors
Ugandan chess players
Place of birth missing (living people)
Competitors at the 2019 African Games
African Games competitors for Uganda